The Doctor, the Murder, the Mystery: The True Story of the Dr. John Branion Murder Case is a book written by Barbara D'Amato and published by Noble Press Inc on 1 March 1992 which later went on to win the Anthony Award for Best True Crime in 1993.

References 

Anthony Award-winning works
Non-fiction crime books
1992 books